Mark Alan McPeek is an American biologist focusing in evolutionary biology, community ecology, sexual selection, phylogenetic studies, adaptation, and population biology. He is currently the David T. McLaughlin Distinguished Professor of Biological Sciences at Dartmouth College.

References 

Fellows of the American Association for the Advancement of Science
Dartmouth College faculty
21st-century American biologists
University of Kentucky alumni
Michigan State University alumni
Living people
Fellows of the Ecological Society of America
Year of birth missing (living people)